Abdulrahman Al-Jassim (Arabic:عبد الرحمن الجاسم) (born 1 May 1993) is a Qatari footballer. He currently plays as a defender.

Career
He formerly played for Al-Arabi, Al-Ahli, Al-Shahania, Mesaimeer, Muaither, and Al-Bidda .

External links

References

Living people
1993 births
Qatari footballers
Al-Arabi SC (Qatar) players
Al Ahli SC (Doha) players
Al-Shahania SC players
Mesaimeer SC players
Muaither SC players
Al Bidda SC players
Qatar Stars League players
Qatari Second Division players
Association football defenders
Place of birth missing (living people)